The 2016–17 High Point Panthers men's basketball team represented High Point University during the 2016–17 NCAA Division I men's basketball season. The Panthers, led by eighth-year head coach Scott Cherry, played their home games at the Millis Athletic Convocation Center as members of the Big South Conference. They finished the season 15–16, 9–9 in Big South play to finish in fifth place. They lost in the quarterfinals of the Big South tournament to Gardner–Webb.

Previous season
The Panthers finished the 2015–16 season 21–11, 13–5 in Big South play to win a share of the regular season championship. They defeated Longwood in the quarterfinals of the Big South tournament before losing to UNC Asheville in the semifinals. As a regular season conference champion and No. 1 seed in their conference tournament who did not with their conference tournament, they received an automatic bid to the National Invitation Tournament where they lost in the first round to South Carolina.

Roster

Schedule and results 

|-
!colspan=12 style=| Non-conference regular season

|-
!colspan=12 style=| Big South regular season

|-
!colspan=12 style=| Big South tournament

References

High Point Panthers men's basketball seasons
High Point